Paula Arundell is an Australian actress and singer.

Early life
Arundell studied at the National Institute of Dramatic Art (NIDA), in Sydney. She graduated in 1995, with a degree in Performing Arts (Acting).

Career
Arundell has appeared on television in Water Rats, Murder Call, Farscape, All Saints, Home and Away, Out of the Blue and Love My Way among others.

Arundell's films have included Disgrace, Dags, Sample People, Gods of Egypt, and the upcoming Harmony.

As a singer, Arundell performed a version of the Tim Buckley song "Song to the Siren", which was used in the 2006 Neil Armfield film Candy.

She also voiced Sonic the Hedgehog in the Sonic Live in Sydney theme park.

She also played an older Hermione Granger in the Melbourne production of Harry Potter and the Cursed Child. In 2021, Arundell joined the cast of Neighbours as Evelyn Farlow for a two-week guest stint.

Filmography

Film

Television

Theme parks

Theatre

References

External links
 
 Paula Arundell at Youtube

Living people
Actresses from Sydney
Australian film actresses
Australian stage actresses
Australian people of South African descent
Australian television actresses
Helpmann Award winners
Australian actors of African descent
Year of birth missing (living people)